The Angiogenesis Foundation, is a United States 501(c)(3) nonprofit organization established in 1994 for the study of angiogenesis. The founders were former students of Dr. Judah Folkman, a pioneer of angiogenesis research.

The foundation focuses on treatments in the areas of cancer, cardiology, wound healing, dermatology, and ophthalmology.

The foundation developed a therapy for canine cancer, called the Navy Protocol.  This treatment works by starving the tumor of its blood supply.

In 1998, the Foundation led the establishment of angiogenic growth factor therapy as the first advanced treatment for diabetic foot ulcers.  In 2004, they helped publicly launch the first antiangiogenic therapy for cancer, bevacizumab, starting with colorectal cancer, and later broadening to breast, lung, liver, kidney, and brain cancers.

External links
 The Angiogenesis Foundation Homepage

References

Cancer charities in the United States
Charities based in Massachusetts
Health charities in the United States
Organizations established in 1994
Medical and health organizations based in Massachusetts